Uebert Angel (born Uebert Mudzanire; 6 September 1978) is a British-Zimbabwean Businessman, charismatic evangelical preacher and the founder of Spirit Embassy, a Pentecostal ministry in the United Kingdom. He is also the Presidential Envoy  and Ambassador At Large for the country of Zimbabwe to Europe and the Americas. He is commonly referred to as Prophet Angel and also formerly known as Uebert Angel Mudzanire. The church was founded in 2007 as "Spirit Embassy" and in October 2015 it rebranded its name to "Good News Church", retaining "Spirit Embassy" as a term for Angel's overall ministry.

Described as "a young charismatic prophet", Angel travels by helicopter to preach the message that God wants his flock to be rich, as rich as he is.

He is also the founder of The Angel Organisation which is the parent company for his other business interests.

Angel has been critiqued for advocating prosperity theology through his sermons, teachings and writings, or the prosperity gospel, a pseudo-theological belief that the reward of financial and material gain is the divine will of God for all pious Christians.

He has also had multiple controversies surrounding his ministry and charities and has had warrants issued against him. He has been accused of financial fraud and sexual misconduct.

Life and career
Angel was born and grew up in Masvingo, Zimbabwe. He later moved to Manchester, England, where he founded the Spirit Embassy ministry in 2007. In October 2015 it re-branded its name to the "Good News Church" (sometimes referred to as "Spirit Embassy Good News Church"). The church ministry attracted numerous followers and there are currently 70 branches in over 15 different countries in Europe, Africa and the US. Angel has also launched Miracle TV and Good News TV where he carries out regular speaking engagements and broadcasts programs on behalf of the Good News Church. He is also the founder and president of Osborn Institute of Theology, an online Bible school which was launched in August 2012. Angel has two financial degrees one post-graduate degree in education from University of Bolton and a Masters in Entrepreneurship from the University of Edinburgh.

Ambassadorial Role 
In March 2021 Angel was appointed as the nation of Zimbabwe's Ambassador at Large and Presidential Envoy by Zimbabwean president H.E. President Emmerson Mnangagwa. The ambassadorial role came with the responsibility for Angel to seek trade and investment opportunities for the country of Zimbabwe. Since being appointed Angel has embarked on a number of projects.

Business activities
Angel started his career in 2005 as a businessman when  he founded Club Millionaire Limited, providing concierge services in Britain. He entered the real estate business developing residential properties and later moved to commercial establishments, land and building acquisition, as well as buying and selling of properties. In 2006 he made his first property sale, and in 2008 he founded Sam Barkeley Construction and The Angel Organisation, the parent company for his business interests, of which he currently is CEO. He also runs other business enterprises under the parent company, including Brits Bank and Atom Mobile. He is also the founder of The Millionaire Academy, whose stated purpose is to instruct individuals how to become successful entrepreneurs and run businesses of their own.

In 2014, a Radio Station in Zimbabwe claimed to have access to an "unedited Forbes Magazine story" detailing Uebert Angel's wealth. A later article at ZimEye.net reported these claims to be false, it also was highly critical of his business practices. Angel is involved in a number of commercial real estate projects including the transformation of an old West Midlands Cinema and nightclub into a theatre style events centre. Another UK project is the building of Angel's office headquarters in Lincolnshire, East Midlands.

Humanitarian activities
Angel and his wife Beverly Angel have both been involved in charity work since the launch of his church in 2007. He helps poor families in Africa and Asia by providing monthly groceries and paying tuition fees of children thorough his "Adopt a Family" scheme. In November 2015, he founded Uebert Angel Foundation with his wife which helps poor students by providing scholarships, and tuition fees for education. He is also founder of Free Earth Humanitarian Organisation which works to ensure that underprivileged people have their basic needs for living met. In January 2020 the Angels paid school fees for an entire school of 797 students at Kadyamadare Primary School in the Chikwaka Communal Lands in Zimbabwe. This was done again through Uebert Angel's charity arm the Uebert Angel Foundation (UAF). The foundation followed this up in February when they did the same for 1026 students at Bota Primary School in Masvingo, paying their school fees including levies – for the whole year.

During the Covid-19 pandemic the Uebert Angel Foundation (UAF) executed a number of charitable projects which started with $15,000 in mealie meal to feed vulnerable families in Chitungwiza, Zimbabwe. That was followed one month later when UAF donated bags of mealie meal and cooking oil to vulnerable members of his 5000 strong branch of Spirit Embassy: GoodNews Church in Harare, Zimbabwe.

Controversies & Scams

Prosperity theology
Angel has been critiqued for advocating prosperity theology through his sermons, teachings and writings, or the prosperity gospel, a pseudo-theological belief that the reward of financial and material gain is the divine will of God for all pious Christians.
Thus, his ministry appears to be indirectly promoting tithing and prosperity theology in a very persuading manner. This is similar to the doctrines of other mega churches, televangelists, and several prominent figures associated with prosperity theology.

Angel has been in the centre of multiple scams and controversies throughout his ministry and various charities, leading to him being called a 'fraudster' or a 'false prophet'. Despite attempts to brush the allegations aside, there have been various accusations nevertheless, which have been both financial and sexual in nature.

Sexual Misconduct
It has also been alleged that Angel has committed sexual misconduct, has blackmailed or persuaded women into sexual acts, and has had multiple extra-marital relationships.

Bentley Continental Fraud Case
The accusations also include defrauding a Bentley Continental from the owner, which was valued at over $300,000. It was assumed that Angel fled to the UK in 2015 to avoid arrest warrants in Zimbabwe over summons issued regarding these allegations.

Books
 I went to Hell (2021)
Genetics of Words (2020)
Spiritual Warfare (2020)
 Hello Holy Spirit (2019)
 The Prayer that God Cannot Ignore (2016)
 Provoking the Angels of Money (2016)
 Defeating the Demon of Poverty (2016)
 Becoming a Millionaire in Real Estate (2016)
 God's Get Rich Quick Scheme (2016)
 Good News (2016)
 The Greatest Secret God Told Me about Money (2015)
 Prayer Banks (2014)
 God's Medicine (2013)
 Praying for the Impossible (2012)
How To Hear The Voice of God (2017)
 Supernatural Power of the Believer (2010)

References

External links

 

Religion in Zimbabwe
Living people
1978 births